The Health Center Consolidation Act of 1996 in the United States is commonly also called Section 330.  The Act brings together various funding mechanisms for the country's community health facilities, such as migrant/seasonal farmworker health centers, healthcare for the homeless, health centers and health centers for residents of public housing.  Previously, each of these organizations were provided grants under numerous other mechanisms.

The S. 1044 legislation was passed by the 104th U.S. Congressional session and enacted into law by the 42nd President of the United States Bill Clinton on October 11, 1996.

See also
 Federally Qualified Health Center
 Rural health clinic

References

External links

Acts of the 104th United States Congress
United States federal health legislation